Ernest Krause (July 3, 1866 – unknown) was an American coxswain serving in the United States Navy during the Spanish–American War who received the Medal of Honor for his bravery.

Biography
Born on July 3, 1866, in Lübeck, Germany, Krause was living in New York City when he enlisted in the U.S. Navy.

On May 11, 1898, Nashville was given the task of cutting the cable leading from Cienfuegos, Cuba. During the operation and facing heavy enemy fire, Krause continued to perform his duties throughout this action.

In January 1907, Krause was "discharged less than honorably" while stationed in Portsmouth, New Hampshire. Nothing of his life is documented after his duties in the service, and his death date and location are unknown.

Medal of Honor citation
Rank and organization: Coxswain, U.S. Navy. Born: 3 July 1866, Germany. Accredited to: New York. G.O. No.: 521, 7 July 1899.

Citation:

On board the U.S.S. Nashville during the operation of cutting the cable leading from Cienfuegos, Cuba, 11 May 1898. Facing the heavy fire of the enemy, Krause displayed extraordinary bravery and coolness throughout this action.

See also

List of Medal of Honor recipients for the Spanish–American War

References

External links

1866 births
Year of death missing
German emigrants to the United States
Military personnel from New York City
United States Navy sailors
American military personnel of the Spanish–American War
United States Navy Medal of Honor recipients
German-born Medal of Honor recipients
Spanish–American War recipients of the Medal of Honor
Military personnel from Lübeck